In the Mormon fundamentalist movement, the 1886 Revelation is the text of a revelation said to have been received by John Taylor, third President of the Church of Jesus Christ of Latter-day Saints (LDS Church), on 27 September 1886, which restated the permanence of the principle of plural marriage. Along with Joseph Smith, Jr.'s 1843 revelation on plural marriage, the 1886 revelation is one of the primary documents used by Mormon fundamentalists to justify their continued practice of polygamy. The LDS Church, which issued manifestos in 1890 and 1904 to terminate the practice of plural marriage, does not accept the 1886 revelation as authentic.

Origins 

In February 1911, church leaders convened to discuss what was to be done with John W. Taylor, Taylor's son and a then-apostle who was being threatened with excommunication for opposing the church's shift in policy towards forbidding the practice of plural marriage. At this meeting, the younger Taylor told the leaders present that his father had "received a revelation which however was never presented to the Church." He also claimed to have discovered the revelation among his father's papers after his death in 1887. Photographs of the original document exist, but the document itself is not extant. In the LDS Archives' John Taylor Papers, there is a copy of the original manuscript said to have been made by Joseph Fielding Smith Jr. on 3 August 1909. Examinations of the photographs have suggested that the document is in John Taylor's handwriting, and it has been claimed that Quorum of the Twelve member Melvin J. Ballard remarked that the document "never had his [Taylor's] signature added to it but was written in the form of a revelation and undoubtedly was in his handwriting." Dr. Reed C. Durham, an unorthodox and sometimes controversial historian as well as former director of the Institute of Religion, is the subject of a quotation which, it has been claimed, was delivered at a high priests' quorum meeting on 24 February 1974. The quotation, cited in "1886 on Trial" by Drew Briney, says that:

There was a revelation that John Taylor received and we have it in his handwriting. We've analyzed the handwriting. It is John Taylor's handwriting and the revelation is reproduced by the fundamentalists. That's supposed to prove the whole story because there was indeed a revelation. The revelation is dated September 27; that fits the account of a meeting, 1886. 

Mormon historian D. Michael Quinn investigated an envelope prepared by John W. Taylor, which contained an unpublished revelation to his father on 19 November 1877 concerning the settlement of the Brigham Young estate. J. W. Taylor's handwritten note is dated to 22 October 1887 and claims that the envelope holds a number of other documents in addition to the 1877 revelation. The younger Taylor presented these documents, which supposedly included the 1886 revelation, to Wilford Woodruff in 1887. This envelope wound up in the Joseph F. Smith Papers within the Church Historian's Office, where Quinn had studied them in 1971. Quinn argues that the younger Taylor might have received back the original 1886 revelation document after leaving the Quorum of the Twelve, as they were later in the possession of his brother Frank Y. Taylor, who sent it to the First Presidency on 18 July 1933.

Beginnings of fundamentalism 
In 1912, Lorin C. Woolley, a Mormon fundamentalist leader, published a claim that five copies of the revelation had been made and entrusted to LDS Church apostle George Q. Cannon with the intent of preserving the practice for posterity. According to the full story, President Taylor was in hiding from federal marshals and in September 1886 took refuge in John W. Woolley's home in Centerville, Utah. Supposedly, on a Sunday afternoon, a delegation of LDS church officials visited President Taylor and urged him that the church ought to renounce plural marriage. That night, Taylor prayed to the Lord about it and received a lengthy visitation from Jesus Christ and Joseph Smith, who instructed him to yield neither to federal nor internal pressures. In Woolley's version of the story, he was reading Doctrine and Covenants in his room when he was "suddenly attracted to a light appearing under the door leading to President Taylor's room, and was at once startled to hear the voices of men talking there. There were three distinct voices." Woolley ran to the door out of concern for Taylor's well-being but found it bolted shut. Woolley was confused, but continued to stand by the door until morning, when Taylor emerged from his room with a "brightness of his personage." Taylor explained to he and the other man, who were all now at the door, "Brethren, I have had a very pleasant conversation all night with Brother Joseph [Smith]." Woolley questioned him about the voices, to which he was told that the third one belonged to Jesus Christ. With little further explanation, Taylor afterwards placed “each person under covenant that he or she would defend the principle of Celestial or Plural Marriage, and that they would consecrate their lives, liberty and property to this end, and that they personally would sustain and uphold the principle.” After telling these eleven-or-so men of this experience, he wrote the revelation down and had his secretary L. John Nuttall make five copies. At the urging of Taylor, all of those present entered into a "solemn covenant and promise that they would see to it that not a year should pass without plural marriages being performed and children born under the covenant." Afterwards, Taylor set apart five individuals (John W. Woolley, Lorin C. Woolley, George Q. Cannon, Samuel Bateman, and Charles Henry Wilcken) for this calling. He also supposedly ordained all five of them save Cannon as apostles (as Cannon already was one), and then charged them with the responsibility to perpetuate plural marriage, regardless of whatever official Church practice might be.

Although the core of Woolley's story remained intact, some details evolved over time. For instance, originally he claimed to only recall the month, but later on attached a confident date of 26–27 September. The list of individuals present also shifted over time.

Contents 
The text of the revelation is as follows:

1886 Revelation 
Given to President John Taylor September 27, 1886
My son John, you have asked me concerning the New and Everlasting Covenant how far it is binding upon my people.

Thus saith the Lord: All commandments that I give must be obeyed by those calling themselves by my name unless they are revoked by me or by my authority, and how can I revoke an everlasting covenant, for I the Lord am everlasting and my everlasting covenants cannot be abrogated nor done away with, but they stand forever.

Have I not given my word in great plainness on this subject? Yet have not great numbers of my people been negligent in the observance of my law and the keeping of my commandments, and yet have I borne with them these many years; and this because of their weakness—because of the perilous times, and furthermore, it is more pleasing to me that men should use their free agency in regard to these matters. Nevertheless, I the Lord do not change and my word and my covenants and my law do not, and as I have heretofore said by my servant Joseph: All those who would enter into my glory must and shall obey my law. And have I not commanded men that if they were Abraham’s seed and would enter into my glory, they must do the works of Abraham. I have not revoked this law, nor will I, for it is everlasting, and those who will enter into my glory must obey the conditions thereof; even so, Amen.

See also
 List of non-canonical revelations in the Church of Jesus Christ of Latter Day Saints

References

Mormon fundamentalism
History of the Latter Day Saint movement
Revelation, 1886
Revelation
19th-century Mormonism
Works about polygamy in Mormonism
Revelation
Works by presidents of the church (LDS Church)
Revelation in Mormonism